Black Lake is a Denesuline First Nations band government in the boreal forest of northern Saskatchewan, Canada. It is located on the northwest shore of Black Lake where the Fond du Lac River leaves the lake to flow to Lake Athabasca.

Black Lake Dene Nation 
Black Lake Dene Nation is a band government with territory at three locations: Chicken 224, Chicken 225 and Chicken 226.
It includes the village of Black Lake (population 1.070 in 2011) and extends from Black Lake up to the border of the village of Stony Rapids and includes territory on both sides of the Fond du Lac River. 

Black Lake First Nation had a total registered membership of 2,044 with 1,592 members residing on-reserve and 452 members residing at locations off-reserve in September, 2013. It is a member of the Prince Albert Grand Council.

Demographics 
The 2011 census reported 1,040 residents of Black Lake chose Dene as their mother tongue in 2011. All but 5 residents spoke English.

Infrastructure

Transportation 
Black lake is accessible via road year round following the completion of secondary Highway 905 (Previously a seasonal road). Black lake is also accessible from the community of Stony Rapids (which is accessible by air) by road.

The community is served by air by Black Lake Water Aerodrome, and by Stony Rapids Airport.

Health care 

The Athabasca Health Facility completed in 2003 at the cost of $12.7 million provides health care services to the Athabasca region. The hospital, located on reserve land (Chicken 224) adjacent to the northern hamlet of Stony Rapids, is part of the Athabasca Health Authority.

Education 
Father Porte Memorial School offers kindergarten to 12 and has an enrolment of 460 students.

See also 
Denesuline
Denesuline language
Treaty 8

References 

Dene communities
Unincorporated communities in Saskatchewan